Operation Herrick was the codename under which all British operations in the War in Afghanistan were conducted from 2002 to the end of combat operations in 2014. It consisted of the British contribution to the NATO-led International Security Assistance Force (ISAF), and support to the American-led Operation Enduring Freedom (OEF), within the central Asian country.

Operation Herrick superseded two previous efforts in Afghanistan. The first of these was Operation Veritas, which consisted of support during the United States invasion of Afghanistan in October 2001. The last major action of this was a sweep in east Afghanistan by 1,700 Royal Marines during Operation Jacana, which ended in mid-2002. The second was Operation Fingal, which involved leadership and a 2,000 strong contribution for a newly formed ISAF in Kabul after December 2001. Command was subsequently transferred to NATO ally Turkey several months later and the British contingent was scaled back to 300. Since then, all combat operations in Afghanistan have been conducted under Operation Herrick. After 2003, Operation Herrick increased in size and breadth to match ISAF's growing geographical intervention in Afghanistan.

In December 2012 the UK Prime Minister David Cameron announced that 3,800 troops, almost half of the force serving in Helmand Province, would be withdrawn during 2013 with numbers to fall to approximately 5,200. The UK ceased all combat operations in Afghanistan and withdrew the last of its combat troops on 27 October 2014. Between 2001 and 24 July 2015 a total of 454 British military personnel died on operations in Afghanistan.

With the end of combat operations, British military operations in Afghanistan focused on training as part of Operation Toral, the UK's contribution to the NATO Resolute Support Mission. This operation ended in July 2021.

Strategy

It was the UK Government's position that the UK could not disengage from Afghanistan and so retained an active military presence until December 2014 (particularly Helmand province) because of the continued terrorist threat facing Britain and the world. Building a strong Afghan state is a long and difficult task. The Liberal–Conservative coalition government (May 2010 – May 2015) declared that Afghanistan was the UK's top foreign policy priority.

Kabul & Northern Afghanistan
Between 2002 and 2003, the primary component of Herrick remained the 300 personnel providing security in Kabul and training to the new Afghan National Army (ANA). In mid-2003, the operation became battalion strength when a provincial reconstruction team (PRT) was established in Mazari Sharif and in Maymana. The UK also provided a rapid reaction force for the area. Overall command of the PRTs was transferred to ISAF in 2004. Sweden and Norway took over these PRTs in 2005 and 2006 respectively to allow the UK to focus on south Afghanistan. In early 2006, the NATO Headquarters Allied Rapid Reaction Corps (ARRC) became the headquarters of ISAF for a year. The attached British infantry and signals personnel raised the number of troops based in Kabul to 1,300.

Kandahar

In 2004, a detachment of six Royal Air Force fighters from Joint Force Harrier was based at Kandahar Airfield to support American OEF forces there. A planned withdrawal in mid-2006 was postponed to provide air support for the new ISAF expansion across the south. The force was later reinforced with more Harriers and an RAF Regiment squadron. The Harriers were withdrawn in 2009 and replaced by a Panavia Tornado GR4 squadron on rotation.

On 2 September 2006, a Hawker Siddeley Nimrod MR2 patrol aircraft, serial number XV230 supporting Canadian forces in Operation Medusa crashed near Kandahar, killing all 14 service members aboard. The cause was related to fuel lines.

4 more Harrier GR9s were committed in May 2007 bringing them to a total of eleven, along with an extra C130 transport plane and four Westland Sea Kings from the Fleet Air Arm. Harriers have been succeeded by Tornados. Merlin and Chinook helicopters are also based there.

The majority of aircraft deployed for Herrick were based at Kandahar.

Helmand

Mission

In January 2006, Defence Secretary John Reid announced the UK would send a PRT with several thousand personnel to Helmand for at least three years. This had been planned as part of the gradual expansion of ISAF's area of responsibility from the Kabul region to the rest of Afghanistan. An initial strength of 5,700 personnel in Afghanistan was planned, which would stabilise to around 4,500 for the rest of the deployment.

The move was to be a coordinated effort with other NATO countries to relieve the predominantly American OEF presence in the south. To this end, the Netherlands and Canada would lead similar deployments in Oruzgan and Kandahar respectively. Several other countries would support this move with troops. In the case of Helmand, Denmark sent 750 troops while Estonia would increase their Helmand force to 150 soldiers.

Local Taliban figures voiced opposition to the incoming force and pledged to resist it.

Activities

Before the main deployment, the Royal Engineers constructed a central fortification, Camp Bastion, to serve as a main base. A camp for an Afghan force (Camp Shorabak, initially for 3rd Brigade, 205th Corps) was built nearby. On 1 May, the US OEF force was relieved in a ceremony. At the same time, the United States began a major offensive, Operation Mountain Thrust, against the insurgency in south Afghanistan. This brought ISAF forces into open conflict with the Taliban.

British forces originally tried to provide security to reconstruction, but instead became engaged in combat. Platoon houses were soon established in northern settlements, due to pressure from the provincial governor for an aggressive stance. However, these quickly became a focus for heavy fighting. One of these was in Sangin, which was cut off and surrounded by the Taliban in early July. Eleven soldiers were killed in Sangin District over the subsequent period. On 16 July, with support from American and Canadian forces, 200 paratroopers were airlifted to take the town.

In early August, 500 paratroopers and Afghan National Army (ANA) soldiers were airlifted to Musa Quala after violence flared around the platoon house. One British soldier was killed in the battle. On 25 August, several hundred soldiers were involved in a second operation to escort a group of Afghan policemen as a show of force.

The Taliban made direct assaults on the British-held compounds, attacking with small arms fire, RPGs, and mortar rounds at short range. The British responded with airstrikes and artillery, often aimed right outside their compound walls, in what became a close quarters battle.

Casualties increased on both sides, with many more Taliban casualties as their assault had exposed them to the full scope of NATO's heavier firepower. Numbers of civilian casualties and damage to local infrastructure increased. The NATO forces grew increasingly concerned that they were alienating residents with heavy-handed tactics, in spite of their intention to win "hearts and minds". It was also becoming clear that the British did not have the number of troops and helicopters to sustain the platoon house strategy indefinitely under the circumstances. Realising that the situation could not carry on unchanged, British commanders approached local tribal leaders to organise a temporary ceasefire.

Through pressure from the local tribal elders and their mounting casualties, the Taliban agreed to withdraw from the contested towns at the same time as the British, having been unable to realise their goal of forcibly expelling the foreign troops. NATO estimated Taliban losses over the summer period to be around 1,000 killed in Helmand alone.

The British commander, Brigadier Ed Butler, later said the deal had come just 48 hours before Musa Quala was planned to be abandoned because of the risks support helicopters were taking. As a result of the deal, British forces peacefully withdrew from the settlement in mid October.
The truce drew criticism from American commanders who believed it showed a sign of weakness on NATO's part. The deal would again be called into question when the Taliban retook the town of Musa Qala by surprise in February 2007, following the killing of a leading commander in an American airstrike. The town was eventually retaken by British and Afghan forces.

By late September, 31 British soldiers had died in Afghanistan over the year. Corporal Mark Wright, was posthumously awarded the George Cross and Corporal Bryan Budd was posthumously awarded the Victoria Cross, the British Armed Forces' highest awards for gallantry. Brigadier Butler declared the Taliban to have been "tactically defeated" for the time being.

Response
The stress of operations was admitted to be unexpected by the Ministry of Defence, and there was increasing pressure to send more forces to Helmand. Lieutenant General David J. Richards said that this was the heaviest persistent combat the British Armed Forces had experienced since the Korean War or the Second World War.

As a result, Operation Herrick was increased to 7,700 personnel. Additional aircraft, artillery pieces (including 4GMLRS) and armoured vehicles (such as Warrior IFVs), an additional Platoon of Snipers were also sent.

Operation Mar Karadad

As of December 7, 2007, an alleged 2000 Taliban rebels occupied Musa Qala. Coalition forces prepared for a siege of the town. Operation Mar Karadad  (translated as Operation Snakebite) was commanded by HQ Task Force Helmand, a bolstered HQ 52 Infantry Brigade, supported by 82nd Airborne Task Force Corsair. Afghan troops supported by British, Danish and US troops fought for control of the town, which was a major Taliban drug trafficking station and the Taliban's only occupied village in the strategically crucial Helmand province. It was considered to be of symbolic importance to both international forces and insurgents operating in the area.

There has been some civilian evacuation, partly aided by the aerial dropping of leaflets warning of the impending battle. In preparation, it was believed that the village was heavily mined by Taliban fighters. Sergeant Lee Johnson of the 2nd Bn The Yorkshire Regiment was killed shortly after 10am on 8 December 2007, whilst taking part in an operation to recapture the town, when a land mine exploded. The Taliban insurgents withdrew from the area by midday on 10 December leaving the Afghan army and NATO forces in control of the town. This was the major operation of Operation HERRICK 7 for Task Force Helmand.

Operation Volcano

In early February 2007, at the end of a six-week operation, the Royal Marines cleared 25 Taliban compounds in the proximity of the Kajaki hydroelectric dam in order to allow repair work to be conducted on the machinery.

Operation Achilles

In between early March to late May 2007, the British led Operation Achilles, NATO's drive to push the Taliban out of Helmand.

In early May 2007 Operation Silver, a sub-operation of Achilles, successfully expelled Taliban fighters from the town of Sangin. It was followed in mid-May by Operation Silicon, where British led forces removed the Taliban from Gereshk and much of the surrounding countryside. The Royal Engineers then set up three camps in the area for the Afghan National Army. The book "The Junior Officers Reading Club" documents Operation Silicon.

Operation Lastay Kulang

A follow up to Achilles, Operation Lastay Kulang was launched on 30 May 2007 near the village of Kajaki Sofle, 10 kilometres to the southwest of Kajaki, to remove a Taliban force encamped there. A force of 1000 British troops, another thousand ISAF soldiers, and elements of the Afghan National Army moved into the area to confront the insurgents. On the night of 30 May the American 82nd Airborne Division conducted an air assault on enemy positions during which one of their Chinook helicopters crashed, apparently due to enemy fire, killing five Americans, a Briton and a Canadian.

By the second of June, ISAF and Afghan forces had isolated several pockets of insurgent fighters in the north and south of the Upper Sangin valley.  In an effort to win over local support, the Royal Engineers have started work on several reconstruction projects, such as digging irrigation ditches to help farmers in the area. Operation Lastay Kulang is described in the book, Attack State Red, about the Royal Anglian Battle Group in Helmand.

Taliban spring offensive

By late May 2007 the Taliban spring offensive promised for March 2007 had failed to materialise. This is put down in part to the massive casualties the Taliban took while trying to storm British strongholds across Helmand and by systematic attacks on their mid-level commanders during operations over the winter, which has hampered their ability to coordinate large troop movements.

The Daily Telegraph reported that they wouldn't "discount the Taliban as a spent force just yet", as an "increase in enemy tempo" was expected. As of October 2008 the number of clashes has risen from five a day to 15, lasting from 10 minutes to 11 hours.

In a new development, it has been reported that the Taliban may be recruiting child soldiers from the tribal areas of neighbouring Pakistan to fight coalition forces.

Build-up to summer offensive
In February 2008 the Taliban prepared for the summer offensive with a number of attacks on JTAC Hill.

British royal family involvement

On 28 February an American website, the Drudge Report, reported that Prince Harry, a member of the Household Cavalry, was operating as a Forward Air Controller on JTAC Hill with a Gurkha unit. The MoD had made agreements with the British and a few other countries' media not to reveal that he was there until he came home or the news was otherwise released. An Australian weekly women's magazine New Idea initially broke the story in January, but it was not followed up at the time. New Idea editors claimed ignorance of any news blackout. Then a German newspaper, the Berliner Kurier, published a short piece on 28 February 2008, also before Drudge. 

In September 2012, Prince Harry, who was known as Captain Wales, deployed with 3 Regiment Army Air Corps to Helmand Province, where he completed an operational tour as an Apache attack helicopter co-pilot gunner, part of the UK Joint Aviation Group, itself part of the US Marine Expeditionary Force.

Kajaki Dam Convoy

In late August one of the largest operations by British and NATO forces in Helmand province took place, with the aim of bringing electricity to the region. A convoy of 100 vehicles took five days to move massive sections of an electric turbine for the Kajaki Dam, covering . The operation involved 2,000 British troops, 1,000 other NATO troops from Australia, Canada, Denmark and the US, and 1,000 Afghan soldiers.

The Canadians covered the first leg and the British took over at a meeting point in the desert, using 50 BvS 10 Viking armoured vehicles to escort the convoy. Hundreds of special forces troops went in first, sweeping the area and although difficult to verify, British commanders estimated that more than 200 insurgents were killed, without any NATO casualties. British BAe Harrier GR9 and AgustaWestland Apaches, Dutch, French and US aircraft, helicopters and unmanned drones provided aerial reconnaissance and fire support. The turbine was finally commissioned in October 2016  .

Other operations
 OP Panchai Palang between 19 June 2009 and July 2009
 Garmsir Area of Operations handed from Task Force Helmand (TFH) to 24th Marine Expeditionary Unit (24 MEU) during June 2009
 Operation Moshtarak starts during February 2010
 Musa Qaleh Area of Operations handed from TFH to I Marine Expeditionary Force (1 MEF) during March 2010.
 Kajaki Area of Operations handed from TFH to 1 MEF during June 2010.
 Sangin Area of Operations handed from TFH to 1 MEF during September 2010.
 OP Qalai Sharqay during May 2011.
 Lead security for Lashkar Gah transferred to ANSF during July 2011.

Equipment

During Operation Herrick a wide variety of equipment was used by the British Army:
 Mastiff 1 from December 2006 and withdrawn during H 17.
 Mastiff 2 from June 2009.
 Snatch Vixen from 2008.
 Lightweight remote control vehicle from November 2008.
 Dragon Runner from November 2008.
 HORN Detector from May 2011.
 RWMIK withdrawn during H 14
 Snatch Vixen withdrawn during H 14
 Jackal 1 withdrawn during H 17
 M270 Multiple Launch Rocket System withdrawn during H 17
 Trojan Armoured Vehicle Royal Engineers

British casualties

As of 24 July 2015, British forces had suffered 454 fatalities.

404 fatalities are classed as "killed in action", and 49 are a result of illness, non-combat injuries or accidents, or have not yet officially been assigned a cause of death pending the outcome of an investigation.

615 people were seriously or very seriously wounded and 2,187 people were wounded in action.

Financial costs
The Net Additional Costs from 2001 to 2018 of Operation Herrick were £22.2 billion. This is costs above the normal running costs of the forces involved and the normal budgetary annual unexpected operations allowance, so is less than both the total costs and the marginal extra costs of the operation. The bulk of the spending was from 2006 to 2014.

According to Investment in Blood, a book by former government adviser Frank Ledwidge, the MOD estimated costs of all military operations in the Afghanistan war to 2012 at about £25 billion. Ledwidge estimated total British government costs were £37 billion ($56.5 billion) to 2012.

See also
 United Kingdom in the Soviet-Afghan War
 Operation Herrick order of battle
 International Security Assistance Force
 Provincial reconstruction team
 Battle of Musa Qala
 Battle of Now Zad
 Siege of Sangin
 Attack State Red

References

Citations

Bibliography

External links

 Operations in Afghanistan - Ministry of Defence
 Operations in Afghanistan - Permanent Joint Headquarters

Al-Qaeda
British Army deployments
21st-century Royal Air Force deployments

Wars involving the Taliban
International Security Assistance Force